Events from the year 1100 in Ireland.

Incumbents
Gilla na Naomh Ua hEidhin, King of Uí Fiachrach Aidhne, 1048–1100
Aodh Ua hEidhin, King of Uí Fiachrach Aidhne, 1100–1121

Deaths
 Gilla na Naomh Ua hEidhin, King of Uí Fiachrach Aidhne